The 1995–96 NBA season was the 50th season for the Knicks in the National Basketball Association in New York City, New York. After Pat Riley left to coach the Miami Heat, the Knicks hired Don Nelson as their new head coach (their "Plan B" after Chuck Daly rejected their offer). The team also signed free agent Gary Grant in November. The Knicks won ten of their first twelve games, leading to a 16–5 start and held a 30–16 record at the All-Star break. However, the team never seemed to get under Nelson down the stretch, as he was fired and replaced with long-time assistant Jeff Van Gundy after 59 games. At midseason, the Knicks traded Charles D. Smith and second-year forward Monty Williams to the San Antonio Spurs in exchange for J.R. Reid and Brad Lohaus, and dealt Doug Christie and Herb Williams to the expansion Toronto Raptors in exchange for Willie Anderson and Victor Alexander. However, after playing just one game for the Raptors, Williams was released and re-signed by the Knicks for the remainder of the season. Under Van Gundy, the Knicks finished the season playing around .500 to post a 47–35 record, second in the Atlantic Division.

Patrick Ewing led the team with 22.5 points, 10.6 rebounds and 2.4 blocks per game, while being selected for the 1996 NBA All-Star Game. In addition, last season's Sixth Man of the Year Anthony Mason became a starter, averaging 14.6 points, 9.3 rebounds and 4.4 assists per game, while Derek Harper provided the team with 14.0 points, 4.3 assists and 1.6 steals per game, John Starks contributed 12.6 points and 1.3 steals per game, and three-point specialist Hubert Davis provided with 10.7 points per game off the bench. Charles Oakley averaged 11.4 points and 8.7 rebounds per game, but only played 53 games due to a broken thumb, and an eye injury.

In the Eastern Conference First Round of the playoffs, the Knicks swept the 4th-seeded Cleveland Cavaliers in three straight games. However, they would lose in five games to the 72–10 Chicago Bulls in the Eastern Conference Semi-finals. The Bulls would defeat the Seattle SuperSonics in six games in the NBA Finals, winning their fourth championship in six years. Following the season, Mason was traded to the Charlotte Hornets, while Harper re-signed as a free agent with his former team, the Dallas Mavericks, Davis was traded to the Toronto Raptors, and Reid, Anderson, Grant, Lohaus and Alexander were all released to free agency.

For the season, the Knicks added the city name "New York" above their primary logo. They also added new blue alternate road uniforms with black side panels, which they wore on the road frequently, that they would become their primary road jerseys for the 1997–98 season, where they would change their home uniforms, adding blue side panels to their jerseys and shorts.

Offseason

NBA draft

The Knicks had no draft picks for 1995.

Roster

Roster notes
 Center Victor Alexander was acquired from the expansion Toronto Raptors at midseason, but missed the entire season due to a foot injury and weight problems, and never played for the Knicks.
 Small forward Anthony Tucker missed the entire season due to a back injury, and never played for the Knicks.
 Center Herb Williams was traded at midseason to the Raptors, where he would play just one game before being waived, and was re-signed by the Knicks for the remainder of the season.

Regular season

Season standings

Record vs. opponents

Schedule

Playoffs

|- align="center" bgcolor="#ccffcc"
| 1
| April 25
| @ Cleveland
| W 106–83
| Patrick Ewing (23)
| three players tied (7)
| three players tied (7)
| Gund Arena16,419
| 1–0
|- align="center" bgcolor="#ccffcc"
| 2
| April 27
| @ Cleveland
| W 84–80
| Anthony Mason (23)
| Mason, Ewing (12)
| John Starks (7)
| Gund Arena17,232
| 2–0
|- align="center" bgcolor="#ccffcc"
| 3
| May 1
| Cleveland
| W 81–76
| John Starks (22)
| Patrick Ewing (10)
| three players tied (4)
| Madison Square Garden19,763
| 3–0
|-

|- align="center" bgcolor="#ffcccc"
| 1
| May 5
| @ Chicago
| L 84–91
| Patrick Ewing (21)
| Patrick Ewing (16)
| Derek Harper (5)
| United Center24,394
| 0–1
|- align="center" bgcolor="#ffcccc"
| 2
| May 7
| @ Chicago
| L 80–91
| Patrick Ewing (23)
| Charles Oakley (11)
| Derek Harper (5)
| United Center24,328
| 0–2
|- align="center" bgcolor="#ccffcc"
| 3
| May 11
| Chicago
| W 102–99 (OT)
| John Starks (30)
| Oakley, Ewing (13)
| John Starks (6)
| Madison Square Garden19,763
| 1–2
|- align="center" bgcolor="#ffcccc"
| 4
| May 12
| Chicago
| L 91–94
| Patrick Ewing (29)
| Patrick Ewing (10)
| Derek Harper (5)
| Madison Square Garden19,763
| 1–3
|- align="center" bgcolor="#ffcccc"
| 5
| May 14
| @ Chicago
| L 81–94
| Patrick Ewing (22)
| Charles Oakley (13)
| Derek Harper (6)
| United Center24,396
| 1–4
|-

Player stats

NOTE: Please write players statistics in alphabetical order by last name.

Season

Playoffs

Transactions

Trades

Free agents

Player Transactions Citation:

Awards and records

Records

Milestones

See also
1995-96 NBA season

References

 Knicks on Database Basketball
 Knicks on Basketball Reference

New York Knicks seasons
1995 in sports in New York City
1996 in sports in New York City
New York Knick
1990s in Manhattan
Madison Square Garden